The Ingushes in Europe — are the Ingush diaspora of 200,000 people. Of these, the largest number of Ingush live in the countries of Western, Northern and Eastern Europe: France, Germany, Belgium, Austria, Norway, Finland, Denmark.

History 
In the post-revolutionary period in Russia, some of the Ingush, who did not want to put up with the power of the Bolsheviks, emigrated to Europe. Among them were active public and political leaders of the North Caucasus Magomet Dzhabagiev, his brother Vassan-Girey Dzhabagiev, journalist Dzhemaldin Albogachiev, Colonel Murtazala Kuriev and many others. All of them were members of socio-political unions in Paris, Warsaw, Istanbul and Berlin and were engaged in publishing and journalistic activities. After the end of World War II, a second wave of emigration of representatives of the Ingush people to Europe followed.

Ukraine 
In Ukraine, on the side of the Ukrainian army, Ingush from Europe, including those in the battalion named after Dzhokhar Dudayev, are participating in hostilities.

Diaspora representatives 
Parchieva Para Razhapovna — Doctor of Philology, Professor at the Sorbonne University in France, holder of the Order of Academic Palms of the third degree

See also 
Ingush diaspora
Ingushes in Turkey
Ingushes in Syria
Ingushes in Jordan

References

Bibliography 
 
 
 

Europe
Ethnic groups in Europe